Nisbet Homestead Farm, also known as the Old Stone House, is located near the LaSalle County town of Earlville, Illinois. The farm itself is actually in DeKalb County. The homestead is a stone structure, the only one in DeKalb County. The stone house was listed on the National Register of Historic Places (NRHP) on May 31, 1984.

History
The homesteaded land was acquired by Matthew Nisbet, who had immigrated from Scotland to Upper Canada in 1818. In 1841 Nisbet came to DeKalb County, Paw Paw Township, and constructed a two-story log cabin, a temporary home he lived in while he built the Old Stone House. The home is constructed of ten-by-four feet blocks of stone; which were hauled from Ottawa, Illinois via ox-cart. Nisbet's home took 15 years to build and has remained in the Nisbet family until 2021.

Nisbet Farm
These various properties are designated as buildings (numbering 5); "structures" (3); and "sites" (2).

Buildings
Five of the properties on the Nisbet Homestead Farm listing are classified as buildings. This includes the main house, completed in 1863 by Nisbet. Nisbet began construction in 1848 and lived in the log cabin during some of that time. The Greek Revival style home is made of a combination of limestone and weatherboard, and sits on a concrete foundation and has an asphalt roof. The site's other four "buildings" were all built before 1935. The earliest among these structures, erected pre-1900, is a wooden gable-roofed barn, of the "English" (or "Three Bay") style. The other circa-1900 structure at the Nisbet Farm is a wooden banked barn. After 1909, a tin-roofed storage shed was constructed; and in 1935 the final of the properties building's was erected, a shingled double corn crib.

Structures
Three of the remaining five properties at the Nisbet Farm are categorized as structures on the NRHP listing. The silo and silo shed were built about 1935. The other two structures, a gravity feed water storage tank, and a windmill driven well, are part of the NRHP listing. The water tank was constructed with stone walls.

Sites
The areas at Nisbet Homestead Farm classified as "sites" include the only structure on the property (besides the Greek Revival home) to date back to 1863; and a 1909 constructed building called the "Basement Barn." The log cabin sits on a stone foundation and was constructed sometime before 1863 and after 1848.

References

National Register of Historic Places in DeKalb County, Illinois
Houses in DeKalb County, Illinois
Farms on the National Register of Historic Places in Illinois